The 2013 Jackson State Tigers football team  represented Jackson State University in the 2013 NCAA Division I FCS football season. The Tigers were led by eighth year head coach Rick Comegy and played their home games at Mississippi Veterans Memorial Stadium. They were a member of the SWAC East Division. Jackson State returned as the defending East Division Champs. The Tigers finished the season with an  record, as East Division Champions and with a loss against Southern in the SWAC Championship Game.

On Media Day, Jackson State was picked to finish second in the Eastern Division of the SWAC. They had two players, Defensive Lineman Tedderick Terrell and Defensive Back Qua Cox selected the Pre-Season All-SWAC 1st Team Defense. Running backs Tommy Gooden and Rakeem Sims, offensive lineman Jordan Arthur, linebacker Todd Wilcher, and defensive back Cameron Loeffler were selected as All-SWAC 2nd Team members.

Schedule

^Games aired on a tape delayed basis

  The October 19 game against Grambling State was forfeited due to Grambling State players refusing to travel to Jackson State. Jackson State subsequently announced their intention to sue Grambling due to the school suffering financial losses.

Media
Jackson State games were broadcast on 95.5 Hallelujah FM. All Jackson State games were also streamed online at no cost via Yahoo!.

References

Jackson State
Jackson State Tigers football seasons
Jackson State Tigers football